Refugio High School is a 2A public high school located in Refugio, Texas (USA). It is part of the Refugio Independent School District located in central Refugio County. In 2015, the school was accredited and met state academic standards.

Athletics
The Refugio Bobcats compete in the following sports:

Volleyball, Football, Basketball, Powerlifting, Golf, Tennis, Track, Softball & Baseball

State Titles
Football - 
1970(2A)^, 1982(3A), 2011(2A/D2), 2016(2A/D1), 2019(2A/D1)
Girls Powerlifting - 
2010(2A)
Girls Golf - 
2005(2A)
Boys Track - 
1981(3A), 1982(3A), 1983(3A), 1987(2A), 1990(2A), 1993(2A), 1994(2A), 1995(2A), 2000(2A), 2001(2A), 2022(2A)
Girls Track - 
1985(3A), 1986(3A), 1987(2A), 1988(2A), 1989(2A), 1992(2A), 2018(2A)
Volleyball - 
1973(2A), 1985(3A)

State Finalists
Football -
1968(3A), 1987(2A), 2013 (2A), 2015(2A/D1), 2017(2A/D1), 2022(2A/D1)
Volleyball -
1980(3A)

^Was Co-Champion with Iowa Park High School

References

External links
 

Public high schools in Texas
Schools in Refugio County, Texas